The following are notable people who were either born, raised or have lived for a significant period of time in Ferizaj.

List 

 Haki Xhakli, painter and university professor
 Genc Iseni, footballer	
 Shefqet Pllana, ethnographer
 Laurit Krasniqi, footballer
 Shtjefën Kurti, priest
 Sefë Kosharja, Albanian military
 Arsim Abazi, footballer
 Lucjan Avgustini, prelate
 Ljuba Tadić, Serbian actor
 Čika Mišo, shoeshiner
 Dardan Çerkini, footballer
 Zana Berisha, model
 Egli Kaja, footballer
 Mozzik, rapper
 Ylber Ramadani, footballer
 Bujar Lika, footballer
 Leard Sadriu, footballer
 Veli Sahiti, singer
 Astrit Fazliu, footballer
 Rreze Abdullahu, writer
 Nehat Islami, journalist
 Ramadan Ramadani, painter
 Regard, disc jockey
 Loredana Zefi, singer
 Stefan Milutin, King of Serbia and founder of nearby Petrič Fortress

References

Ferizaj